Rudy den Outer (born 22 July 1954 in Rotterdam) is a sailor from the Netherlands, who represented his country at the 2008 Vintage Yachting Games in Medemblik, as helmsman in the Dutch Soling Sophie’s Choice. Den Outer with crew members Leo Determan and Ronald den Arend took the Gold. In the 2012 Vintage Yachting Games, this time with crew members Gavin Lidlow and Ramzi Souli the team took the Silver medal in Bellano, Italy. In 2003 with helmsman Fred Imhoff and Richard van Rij he became European Champion in the Dragon at Kinsale, Ireland. Den Outer is also very active in the organization of major International Sailing events for Olympic and former Olympic classes.

Sailing career 

Rudy den Outer, after sailing some Dutch National classes, started his International sailing in 1970 crewing for Leo Determan in the Flying Dutchman. In 1975, Den Outer crewed for Ben Staartjes in the Tempest. He was member of the “Yellow Joker” sailing team of Fred Imhoff. He started crewing for Geert Bakker in the Soling in 1981. After that Rudy started to helm the Soling. During 1999 and 2001, Den Outer crewed for Heike Blok in the Dragon. Along with Richard van Rij and helmsman Fred Imhoff's he was part of the "Danisch Joker" Dragon team in 2002 and 2003.  During the 2018 Vintage the Soling team of Rudy den Outer, Theo de Lange and Gabor Helmhout took the gold during challenging circumstances off the coast of Hellerup, Denmark. In 2019 den Outer as helmsman with Theo de Lange and Thies Bosch took the gold during the 2019 North American Championship 2019 on Lake Ontario, Kingston, Ontario. With Theo de Lange and Ramzi Souli Rudy became European Champion in the Soling at Mandello del Lario, Italy in 2021,. Den Outer is sailing Soling on regular basis in National and International competitions as member of the Kralingsche Zeil Club in Rotterdam.

Regatta organization and management
Rudy den Outer organized the 1990 Soling World Championship (fleetrace) in Medemblik with the Royal Yachtclub Hollandia, the 1993 Soling European Championship, and the 1988 Soling World Championship (both matchrace) at Rotterdam, Kralingen this in cooperation with the Rotterdamsche Zeilvereeniging. Den Outer took in 2006 the initiative for the Vintage Yachting Games. This event for the former Olympic classes is held every four years. Currently Den Outer is chairman of the daily board of the Vintage Yachting Games Organization. He is past committee member of the International Soling Association 3 terms from 1988 till 1997 and Past Vice-President from the same organization (1993).

Personal life 
Den Outer studied Science and Mathematics in Delft. He is married with Sophie van den Berge and is a retired program and project manager within the IT industry.

References

External links 
 

1954 births
Living people
Dragon class sailors
Dutch male sailors (sport)
Flying Dutchman class sailors
North American Champions Soling
European Champions Soling
Sportspeople from Rotterdam
Tempest class sailors